The Truth is the seventh studio and fifth major studio album from American singer Ledisi, released on Verve Records on March 11, 2014. The album had no guest appearances.

Background
Ledisi expressed the album was about self-discovery and growth. She told Amazon "With every album I grow, and with The Truth I've gone to a new level. It's an extension of who I am and where I am in my life". She also stated: "There was a time when I felt like I had to please everybody,"..."Now I'm like 'I don't care anymore."

She also did some mediation and exercise during the making of the album saying "I did some mediation and I started working out hard. Not like how I used to where I would do a couple of crunches and then drink a soda! Now I'm really challenging myself." The song "I Blame You" was written by Claude Kelly, Chuck Harmony and Ledisi (herself).

Critical reception

Andy Kellman from AllMusic found that "as with those preceding albums, The Truth is certainly informed by the past but sounds contemporary; even more vibrant than her own Turn Me Loose but not as rooted in early- to mid-'70s funk and soul [...] Succinct, consistent, vibrant, and all Ledisi all the time – there are no guest appearances – this is one of the singer and songwriter's best releases."

Track listing

Notes
 denotes co-producer

Charts

Weekly charts

Year-end charts

Release history

References

2014 albums
Ledisi albums
Verve Records albums
Funk albums by American artists